Pseudocoremia rudisata is a species of moth in the family Geometridae. It is endemic to New Zealand.

Subspecies
This species has two subspecies;
 Pseudocoremia rudisata ampla (Hudson, 1923)
 Pseudocoremia rudisata rudisata (Walker, 1862)

References 

Boarmiini
Moths of New Zealand
Endemic fauna of New Zealand
Moths described in 1875
Taxa named by Francis Walker (entomologist)
Endemic moths of New Zealand